Streshnevo is a railway station of Line D2 of the Moscow Central Diameters in Moscow. It was opened in 1964 and rebuilt in 2018.

Gallery

References

Railway stations in Moscow
Railway stations of Moscow Railway
Railway stations in Russia opened in 1964
Line D2 (Moscow Central Diameters) stations